Minnie Minoprio (born 4 July 1942) is an English actress, singer and showgirl, mainly active in Italy.

Life and career 
Born Virginia Anne Minoprio in Ware, Hertfordshire, Minoprio after graduating from the Arts Educational School, where she studied acting and singing, debuted at 15 in a stage version of "Cinderella". Two years later moved in Italy where she starred in the revue Io e Margherita, alongside Walter Chiari.

At the same time she began a career as a jazz singer, recording a music album of dixieland and collaborating with other musicians; just with a duet with another singer, Fred Bongusto, she obtained in 1971 her major discographic success, the song "Quando mi dici così", which ranked 20 in the Italian hit parade. Her variegated career also includes radio, television, cinema and two novels, Il passaggio (1992) and Benvenuti a bordo (2007).

Discography
     1969 - New! Dixieland Sound (Contape)
     1973 - Forse Sarà La Musica Del Mare (Fonit Cetra, LPX-30)
     1974 - Ti voglio dare... poco per volta (Spark, SRLP261)
     1983 - Minnie (Hollywood, HO 82702)
     1987 - Anni '40... le canzoni più belle (CGD, 20569) 
     1993 - Good Friends (Rossodisera Records)
     2003 - Jazz (Hollywood)
     2005 - My twilight songs (Hollywood)
     2007 - S(w)inging the blues - Minnie Minoprio quartet & guests (Hollywood)
     2007 - Jason Marsalis & Minnie Minoprio (Hollywood)
     2009 - Why stop now! (Great songs from the 20th century) (NAR International, distr. Edel)

Partial filmography
 Zingara (1969) - Silvia Donati
 Mio padre Monsignore (1971) - Lover of Don Alvaro
 Roma Bene (1971) - Minnie
 The Funny Face of the Godfather (1973) - Bonnie
 Una storia ambigua (1986) - Contessa Anna Guerrieri
 Forever Blues (2005) - Singer

References

External links 

 Official site
 

Living people
English stage actresses
English women singers
1942 births
Italian television personalities
People from Ware, Hertfordshire
English film actresses
English expatriates in Italy
Musicians from Hertfordshire
Actresses from Hertfordshire